Amalie Sebald (24 August 1787 – 4 January 1846) was a German singer and was considered at the beginning of the 20th century to be Beethoven's "Immortal Beloved".

Life 
Born in Berlin, Sebald was a daughter of the alto von Sebald, née Schwadke, and of the Justice Council Karl Christian August Sebald. Like her sister Auguste, who later married the Protestant priest Carl Ritschl, she was a soprano. In the records of the Singakademie her mother is recorded for the year 1791, her daughters for 1801 and 1802 respectively; the three ladies appeared as soloists for the first time in 1794 and 1803 and 1804 respectively.

Beethoven met Sebald in the summer of 1811 in the spa resort Teplitz; she had arrived together with the countess Elisa von der Recke. At that time, the heart of the composer was won, who met her again in Teplice in 1812. Sebald later, on 17 October 1815, married the Berlin Justice Councillor Ludwig Krause (around 1781–1825), whom she survived. while Beethoven remained unmarried and five years later told Gianastasio de Rio that he had little hope of winning over the woman he had fallen in love with.

Sebald apparently still worked as a singing teacher after her marriage. One of her pupils was Lili Parthey, to whom she gave in 1817 a medallion with hair of Queen Luise for her birthday.

Beethoven's love letter 

The Beethoven scholar Wolfgang Alexander Thomas-San-Galli believed in 1910 to have found in Sebald the addressee of the famous Letter to the Immortal Beloved, a letter which Beethoven had written to an unknown person in the Bohemian spa town Teplice on July 6–7, 1812. Thomas-San-Galli's thesis is no longer discussed today.

Sebald died in Berlin at age 58.

Further reading 
 Ludwig Nohl, Beethovens letzte Liebe. In Der Salon für Literatur, Kunst und Gesellschaft, volume 1 (1880),  (Digitalisat)
 Wolfgang Alexander Thomas-San-Galli, Beethoven und die Unsterbliche Geliebte: Amalie Sebald, Goethe, Teréz Brunszvik und anderes, Munich 1910
 Arnold Schering, Zum Bildnis der Amalie Sebald. In Neues Beethoven-Jahrbuch, published by Adolf Sandberger, 5th year (1933), p. 5f.
 Klaus Martin Kopitz, Rainer Cadenbach (editor) among others: Beethoven aus der Sicht seiner Zeitgenossen in Tagebüchern, Briefen, Gedichten und Erinnerungen. Volume 2: Lachner – Zmeskall. published by the Beethoven-Forschungsstelle an der Universität der Künste Berlin. Henle, Munich 2009, .

References

External links 
 

Ludwig van Beethoven
19th-century German women singers
1787 births
1846 deaths
Singers from Berlin